Vladimeri Dgebuadze (born 2 February 1970) is a Georgian judoka.

Achievements

References

External links
 

1970 births
Living people
Male judoka from Georgia (country)
Judoka at the 1996 Summer Olympics
Olympic judoka of Georgia (country)
Goodwill Games medalists in judo
Competitors at the 1990 Goodwill Games
21st-century people from Georgia (country)